Akhund Mahammadali Farajulla oglu Pishnamazzadeh was the seventh Sheikh ul-Islam of the Caucasus.

Early life
He was born on 5 May 1853, in a clerical family in Ganja. He received his education in Tabriz. He was acknowledged as akhund in 1883. In 1890, he was accused of treason and banished to Turkestan along with 37 people but was pardoned in 1892. Same year he was appointed as akhund of Ganja Juma Mosque and elected as member to Tbilisi Regional Spiritual Council next year. He was head of Ganja Regional Spiritual Council as of 1895. In 1906, he was found guilty of being member of Difai and banished to Kazan. Returning from banishment, he was elected as "acting" Sheikh ul-Islam of the Caucasus on 20 July 1909. He met with Tzar Nicholas II of Russia in 1914 during official visit to Tbilisi.

Later life
He was acknowledged as official Sheikh ul-Islam of the Caucasus in 1915 by tzar. He resigned office on 10 December 1918 and continued to be akhund of Ganja Juma Mosque. He died in 1937 during Great Purge.

Sources
Şeyxülislam Axund Məhəmmədəli Pişnamazzadə
Official website of Caucasian Muslims' Board

See also 
 Mirza Abu Turab Akhundzade

Iranian Shia clerics
1937 deaths
1853 births
Azerbaijani religious leaders